The Nanjing Metro is a rapid transit system serving Nanjing, the capital of Jiangsu province, with stations in all of the city's eleven districts. It is constructed, maintained, and operated by the Nanjing Metro Group Company. The results of Nanjing's 2015 Municipal Bureau of Statistics count showed that Nanjing Metro carried a total of 720 million rides that year.

The idea for a metro system in Nanjing was first proposed in 1984 in the Nanjing Municipal People's Congress as a way to ease traffic concerns. An underground alignment was preferred in order to "protect the historical city's monuments and walls". Over the next few years, the city hired researchers and engineers to plan the system and to study existing metros like Hong Kong's MTR. In 1992, construction began on an experimental station in what would later become Sanshanjie station. In 1999, following the successful completion of the station's experimental phase, Nanjing became the fifth city after Beijing, Shanghai, Guangzhou, and Shenzhen to receive approval from the National Development and Reform Commission to begin work on a subway. Roughly one year later in December, construction on the initial  line of the system broke ground.

The system spans  and has 175 stations, divided between urban line stations and S-train line stations. There are 13 transfer stations, Andemen, Daxinggong, Gulou, Jimingsi, Jinmalu, Maqun, Taifenglu, Xiangyulunan, Xinjiekou, Youfangqiao, Yuantong, Nanjing Railway Station, and Nanjing South Railway Station, with the latter two also connecting to China's nationwide conventional rail and high-speed rail network. An additional two stations (Yuantong and Olympic Stadium East) connect to the Hexi tram and one (Lukou International Airport Station) serves the city's international airport. Systemwide, service begins every morning with the earliest train scheduled to depart Yushanlu station on Line 10 at 5:40 a.m. and concludes with the final train scheduled to arrive at Maigaoqiao Station on Line 1 just after 12:27 a.m. the next morning.

Lines 
  Discrepancies between these figures are explained by interchange stations. If interchange stations are counted once for each line they serve, there would be 118 urban line stations, 73 S-line stations, and 191 total stations.

Line 1 is the first operating line in the Nanjing Metro system. The initial north–south  segment became operational on September 3, 2005, serving 16 stops between Maigaoqiao and Olympic Stadium stations. In 2010, a 12-station,  southward extension of Line 1 opened, forking the line at Andemen station; four years later, an extended western fork broke away and became Line 10. Shortly after the southern extension of Line 1 was completed, a second, east–west oriented line opened for service. While originally planned to open in phases, all 26 stations of Line 2 opened simultaneously in May 2010. That same year, groundbreaking work began for Line 3, which opened in 2015 with 29 stations. As of Line 4's opening, there is just under  of urban metro lines in operation.

The Nanjing Metro also operates six S-train branded suburban metro lines: Line S1 (or the Nanjing–Gaochun Intercity Railway Phase I), Line S3 (or the Nanjing–He County Intercity Railway), Line S7 (or the Nanjing–Lishui Intercity Railway), Line S8 (or the Nanjing–Tianchang Intercity Railway), and Line S9 (or the Nanjing–Gaochun Intercity Railway Phase II). The  Line S1 opened in 2014 ahead of the Nanjing 2014 Summer Youth Olympics, and connected Lukou International Airport with the rest of the metro system. Line S8 opened soon after, connecting suburban Luhe District with the metro network, with plans to eventually extend to neighboring Anhui Province. Line S3 opened in late 2017, and is the third line to cross the Yangtze River. Lines S7 and S9, respectively connecting the far southern districts of Lishui and Gaochun to Line S1, opened on May 26, 2018 and December 30, 2017, respectively. Line S6 opened in December 2021, extending the Nanjing Metro system outside of Nanjing city limits for the first time.

As of 2017, Line 5, Line 7, and a five-station northward extension of Line 1 are concurrently under construction.

Stations 

The Nanjing Metro operates 175 stations across nine lines, with 118 stations on the system's five urban lines and 73 along its six S-lines. Among these are transfer stations to China's high-speed rail and conventional passenger rail network, as well as Nanjing's tramway and international airport. Additionally, the metro's expansion plans consist of one urban rail and three suburban rail lines opening within the next five years, expanding the system by an additional 64 stations, with transfer stations counted once per line.

The system's largest and busiest station is Xinjiekou, the transfer station between Lines 1 and 2, with 24 officially marked exits and a floor dedicated to retail and commercial activities. Xinjiekou attracted 158,200 passengers on New Year's Eve in 2015 and 130,500 daily passengers in 2016 during China's week-long National Day holiday. The metro stations in Nanjing South Railway Station and Nanjing Railway Station carried 102,000 and 99,800 daily riders respectively during the same holiday period. Other high-ridership stations include Daxinggong, Sanshanjie, Fuzimiao, Gulou, and Xiamafang.

Key

In operation

Under construction

References

Notes

  Andemen Station has two types of platforms, an elevated platform for Line 1 trains and an underground platform for Line 10 trains.
  Jinmalu Station has two types of platforms, an at-grade platform for Line 2 trains and an underground platform for Line 4 trains.
  Nanjing South Railway Station has two types of platforms: two underground platforms for cross-platform transfers between Line 1 and Line 3 trains, and a separate underground platform for Line S1 and Line S3 trains.
  All station locations are districts of Nanjing except for Jurong, a county-level city under neighboring Zhenjiang.

Citations

External links
 Nanjing Metro Website (in Chinese)

Nanjing
Nanjing
Nanjing Metro